Muchea Tracking Station was an Earth station in Australia located close to Muchea in the 

History
Muchea was established in 1960, and became operational in March 1961. It was Station No. 8 of the 14 Manned Space Flight Network sites around the world used throughout the project. The only other Australian site was Station No. 9, the Island Lagoon Tracking Station at Woomera, South Australia. These 
stations were managed and operated by the Weapons Research Establishment of the Australian Department of Supply on behalf of NASA.

Muchea was equipped with a "VERy LOng Range Tracking" (VERLORT) S band radar operating between 2700 and 2900 MHz. It was also equipped with acquisition aid tracking systems, telemetry reception, and air-to-ground voice communications facilities. Because of its position, close to the antipodes of Cape Canaveral, it was also selected to have a command facility. Information about the range, bearing and elevation of the spacecraft was automatically relayed to the Goddard Space Flight Center by teleprinter.

During each mission a NASA team consisting of two flight controllers and a flight surgeon were sent to Muchea. The Senior Flight Controller, usually another astronaut, acted as capsule communicator (CAPCOM).

Muchea Communications Technician Gerry O'Connor became the first Australian to speak with an astronaut on 20 February 1962, when he contacted John Glenn aboard Friendship 7 on his first pass over the West Australian coast. A small plaque has been installed on the spot occupied by the Communications Technician's console which reads: "This plaque is to mark the spot where an Australian first spoke to a space traveller".

Muchea was closed in February 1964, after the end of the Mercury Project. It was replaced by the Carnarvon Tracking Station for the Gemini and Apollo projects. Although the Muchea Tracking Station no longer exists, the Shire of Chittering has erected a small display about its history.

Missions
The following missions were supported by the Muchea Station:

See also
 List of radio telescopes

References

External links
Muchea Tracking Station tribute website

Astronomical observatories in Western Australia
Earth stations in Western Australia
Project Mercury
Radio telescopes
NASA facilities in Australia
1961 establishments in Australia
1964 disestablishments in Australia